William Wall (5 September 1912 – 17 April 2004) was an Irish sportsperson.  He played hurling with his local club Carrick Swans and was a member of the Tipperary senior inter-county team in the late 1930s.  Wall won a set of All-Ireland and Munster winners' medals with Tipperary in 1937.

References

Teams

1912 births
2004 deaths
Carrick Swans hurlers
Tipperary inter-county hurlers
All-Ireland Senior Hurling Championship winners